Dorsal (from Latin dorsum ‘back’) may refer to:

 Dorsal (anatomy), an anatomical term of location referring to the back or upper side of an organism or parts of an organism
 Dorsal, positioned on top of an aircraft's fuselage
 Dorsal consonant, a consonant articulated with the back of the tongue
 Dorsal fin, the fin located on the back of a fish or aircraft
 Dorsal transcription factor, a maternally synthesized transcription factor

de:Dorsale
fr:Dorsale
it:Dorsale